Philippa June Baker  (born 12 June 1963), now known by her married name Philippa Baker-Hogan, is a former New Zealand rower and politician. She was the first New Zealand woman to win a gold medal at World Rowing Championships and won gold at world championships on two more occasions. She has twice represented New Zealand at the Olympics. She has received numerous awards for her rowing success and in 2012, she and fellow double sculler Brenda Lawson were inducted into the New Zealand Sports Hall of Fame. A trained radiographer, she manages her husband's medical practice. She has been a Whanganui District Health Board and Wanganui District Council member since 2004 and 2006, respectively, and was a mayoral candidate in 2010. She is a member of the New Zealand Labour Party.

Early life
Baker was born in Kaiapoi in 1963. Baker is one of eight children. Her siblings include Erin Baker (New Zealand triathlete) and Kathy and Maureen who were both national champions in swimming and aerobics.

Sporting career
Philippa Baker was initially a triathlete before she switched to rowing. She initially rowed for Canterbury before changing to Cambridge, and took her inspiration from Stephanie Foster, the first New Zealand woman to win a medal at a rowing world championship. In 1992, her coach took up a job with the Swiss rowing team. Baker decided on Dick Tonks as her new coach and thus, in 1993, she moved to Wanganui to join the Union Boat Club. Baker has won a total of 19 or 21 national rowing titles during her career (sources differ). In the 1987–88 season, she was the first rower to win both the lightweight and premier open single sculls title; it was to be 29 years before the achievement was repeated by Zoe McBride in 2017.

Baker competed in the 1986 Commonwealth Games in Edinburgh, Scotland, where she won silver in the lightweight women's single sculls. Later in the same month at the 1986 World Rowing Championships, she came fourth in the same boat. At subsequent world championships in 1987 and 1988, she came fifth and fourth, respectively. At the 1989 World Rowing Championships, she competed in the lightweight women's double sculls, partnering with Linda de Jong as stroke, and won silver.

At the 1991 World Rowing Championships, Baker returned to the lightweight women's single sculls and won gold, the first woman to win gold for New Zealand at World Rowing Championships. Along with Brenda Lawson she finished fourth in the women's double sculls at the 1992 Summer Olympics in Barcelona. At the 1993 and 1994 World Rowing Championships, Baker and Lawson won gold in the double sculls. The duo again competed at the 1995 World Rowing Championships in Tampere, Finland and won a bronze medal. At the 1996 Summer Olympics in the United States, they qualified for the A final but came sixth, i.e. last.</ref>

Awards
Baker was the Waikato sports person of the year in 1989 and 1991; at the time, she was based in Cambridge. For her 1991 gold medal, she won the 1991 supreme award at the Halberg Awards, and she was named New Zealand sportswoman of the year. In the 1993 New Year Honours, both Baker and her sister Erin were appointed Members of the Order of the British Empire, for services to rowing and as a triathlete, respectively. Baker was the Wanganui sports person of the year in 1993 and 1994. Baker and Lawson were named New Zealand team of the year at the 1994 Halberg Awards, and they also won the supreme award. In 2012, Baker and Lawson were inducted into the New Zealand Sports Hall of Fame, the first woman rowers to achieve this accolade. The Sports Hall of Fame citation reads:

Post sport
Baker trained as a radiographer. She is married to the osteopath Shaun Hogan and manages his practice in Whanganui. Baker and Hogan met as he was one of the team doctors for the Union Boat Club.

Baker was elected to the Whanganui District Health Board at the 2004 local elections. In a by-election in 2006, she was elected as a councillor to Wanganui District in support of the then-mayor, Michael Laws. Baker represents the Aramoho ward. In the 2007 local elections, she was confirmed as a district councillor and health board member. After Laws announced his retirement from the mayoralty at the 2010 local elections, Baker was one of the five mayoral candidates, plus she also stood for the district council and the health board. She came a distant fourth in the mayoral race, but was re-elected for the other two positions. In the 2013 local elections, Baker successfully stood for the district council and health board positions again, but not for mayor, but declared that she was a likely mayoral candidate in 2016.

As a district councillor, she caused controversy in 2011 with her comments over Palmerston North's bid when Whanganui was eliminated from the short-list for the proposed New Zealand Cycling Centre of Excellence; in the end, Palmerston North missed out, too, and what has become known as the Avantidrome was built in Cambridge.

Since 2009, she is a trustee of the Whanganui Community Foundation and has been the chair of the organisation since 2013.

References

External links 
 
 
 
 

|-

|-

1963 births
Living people
Rowers at the 1992 Summer Olympics
Rowers at the 1996 Summer Olympics
Olympic rowers of New Zealand
New Zealand city councillors
New Zealand female rowers
People from Kaiapoi
New Zealand radiologists
Rowers from Whanganui
New Zealand sportsperson-politicians
World Rowing Championships medalists for New Zealand
Commonwealth Games silver medallists for New Zealand
Commonwealth Games medallists in rowing
Rowers at the 1986 Commonwealth Games
Whanganui District Health Board members
20th-century New Zealand women
Medallists at the 1986 Commonwealth Games